Kuznetsovo is a rural locality (a village) in Shemogodskoye Rural Settlement, Velikoustyugsky District, Vologda Oblast, Russia. The population was 54 as of 2002.

Geography 
The distance to Veliky Ustyug is 17 km, to Aristovo is 1 km. Verkhneye Pankratovo is the nearest rural locality.

References 

Rural localities in Velikoustyugsky District